George Edward Gick (October 18, 1915 – August 12, 2008) was an American right-handed relief pitcher in Major League Baseball who played for the Chicago White Sox for one game each in the  and  seasons. Listed at 6' 0", 190 lb., he was a switch-hitter. He was born in Dunnington, Indiana.

In his two major league appearances – on October 3,  against the St. Louis Browns and on April 21,  against the Detroit Tigers – Gick posted a perfect 0.00 earned run average with one save and two strikeouts in 3 innings pitched without a decision.

Gick died on August 12, 2008, at the age of 92.

External links

1915 births
2008 deaths
Major League Baseball pitchers
Chicago White Sox players
Baseball players from Indiana
People from Benton County, Indiana